Randolph "Randy" S. Ting (born in Tuguegarao) is a Filipino Politician. Ting is son of Former Tuguegarao City Mayor Delfin Ting. In 2001, he elected as the Mayor of Tuguegarao. During his term, the Tuguegarao has been a Competitive, Livable, Safe and maintaining cleanliness. Year 2002, the city has a big fiscal management in his Term as Mayor. Ting serves as Representative from 3rd District of Cagayan and Succeeded by Joseph L. Lara. Within 9 years in Congress he elected as the Deputy Speaker of the Philippine House of Representatives on January 21, 2019. During his last term, he decided to run as Governor of Cagayan and his wife Nancy run for Congress.

References

Notes

Members of the House of Representatives of the Philippines from Cagayan
Mayors of places in Cagayan
National Unity Party (Philippines) politicians
21st-century Filipino people
Year of birth missing (living people)
Living people